The Ibo River (揖保川) is a river in Hyōgo Prefecture, Japan. The Ibo, Kako, Ichi, Yumesaki, and Chikusa rivers are collectively referred to as the Harima Gokawa, the five major rivers that flow into the Harima Sea. The basin area is the second largest of the Harima Gokawa after the Kako River.

Geography 
The river originates from Mt. Fujinashi (elevation 1,139m) in Shisō, Hyōgo, and flows southward. It runs through Tatsuno and divides Nakagawa to the west near Yobeku, Himeji, forming a delta.

On the embankment in Tatsuno City, there is an area where tatami mats are used to raise the revetment by using the tatami mats when the water level rises.

History 
On September 13, 1976, a landslide occurred in Fukuchi, Ichinomiya-cho due to the torrential rain of Typhoon Fran. The spilled earth and sand filled the river channel and caused flooding.

References

Rivers of Hyōgo Prefecture
Rivers of Japan